Siglap MRT station is a future underground Mass Rapid Transit station on the Thomson–East Coast line in Bedok planning area, Singapore.

The station will be located at Marine Parade Road, near to Victoria School and St. Andrew's Autism Centre.

History
On 15 August 2014, LTA announced that Siglap station would be part of the proposed Thomson–East Coast line (TEL). The station will be constructed as part of Phase 4, consisting of 8 stations between Founders' Memorial and Bayshore, and is expected to be completed in 2024.

Contract T309 for the design and construction of Siglap Station was awarded to John Holland Pty Ltd – Zhen Hua (Singapore) Engineering Pte. Ltd. Joint Venture  at a sum of S$176 million on 21 March 2016. Construction began in 2016, with completion slated for 2024.

Initially expected to open in 2023, the restrictions on the construction due to the COVID-19 pandemic has led to delays in the TEL line completion, and the date was pushed to 2024.

References

Proposed railway stations in Singapore
Mass Rapid Transit (Singapore) stations
Railway stations scheduled to open in 2024